may refer to:

 "Jelly Man", a song from The Dynamic Sound Patterns, by Rod Levitt
 "The Jelly Man", an episode of Dixon of Dock Green
 Kelly Moran (speedway rider), nicknamed "Jelly Man"